Amanda Glenrose Mapena (née Bani) is a South African politician who is the current Member of the Executive Council (MEC) for Sports, Arts and Culture in KwaZulu-Natal, having been appointed in August 2022. She has been a member of the KwaZulu-Natal Legislature since May 2019. Mapena is a member of the African National Congress.

Political career
Mapena was elected to the KwaZulu-Natal Legislature on the ticket of the African National Congress in the 2019 national and provincial elections. Having entered the provincial legislature,  Mapena was appointed chairperson of the sports, arts and culture portfolio committee. In June 2021, Mapena was implicated in an estimated R140 000 fraudulent payment that resulted in the former head of eThekwini parks and recreation department, Thembinkosi Ngcobo, being fired. Mapena is also a member of the ANC provincial elective committee. 

Following the resignation of Sihle Zikalala as the premier of KwaZulu-Natal on 5 August 2022, Mapena was one of three candidates nominated by the ANC PEC to succeed Zikalala. The MEC for Finance, Nomusa Dube-Ncube, was selected by the national executive committee of the ANC to replace Zikalala. On 11 August 2022, Mapena was appointed by premier Dube-Ncube as the MEC for Sports, Arts and Culture.

Personal life
Mapeni is married to William Mapena, the former speaker of the eThekwini Metropolitan Municipality and the former deputy regional chairperson of the ANC in eThekwini.

References

External links

Living people
Year of birth missing (living people)
Place of birth missing (living people)
Zulu people
African National Congress politicians
Members of the KwaZulu-Natal Legislature
Women members of provincial legislatures of South Africa